Tim Head (born 1946) is a British artist.

Biography
Born in London, Head studied at the University of Newcastle upon Tyne from 1965 to 1969, where his teachers included Richard Hamilton and Ian Stephenson. His contemporary students included Roxy Music frontman Bryan Ferry. In 1968 Head went to New York City, where he worked as an assistant to Claes Oldenburg, and met Robert Smithson, Richard Serra, Eva Hesse, Sol LeWitt, John Cale and others. Head studied on the Advanced Sculpture Course run by Barry Flanagan at Saint Martin's School of Art, London, in 1969. In 1971 he worked as an assistant to Robert Morris on his Tate Gallery show. From 1971 to 1979 he taught at Goldsmiths College, London.

In 1987 Head won the 15th John Moores Painting Prize for his work "Cow Mutations".

Head has exhibited widely internationally. His solo shows include MoMA, Oxford (1972); Whitechapel Art Gallery, London (1974 and 1992); British Pavilion, Venice Biennale (1980); ICA, London (1985); and Kunstverein Freiburg, Germany, and touring (1995). He has taken part in group shows including Documenta VI, Kassel (1977); British Art Now: An American Perspective, Solomon R Guggenheim Museum, New York, and Royal Academy, London (1980); The British Art Show, Arts Council Tour (1984); Gambler, Building One, London (1990);Live in Your Head: Concept and Experiment in Britain 1965-75, Whitechapel Art Gallery, London (2000); and The Indiscipline of Painting Tate St. Ives touring to Warwick Art Centre (2011/12).

References

External links
Tim Head Website
Tim Head via British Council
Tim Head via Artcyclopedia
Tim Head via Tate Collection
Tim Head: selected exhibitions

English artists
English contemporary artists
Alumni of Newcastle University
1946 births
Living people
Alumni of Saint Martin's School of Art
Academics of Goldsmiths, University of London